Louis Félix Étienne, marquis de Turgot (26 September 1796, in Falaise, Calvados – 2 October 1866, in Versailles) was a French diplomat and politician.

Family 
He was the son of Étienne-François Turgot (1721–1789), marquis de Soumont; his great-uncle was Anne Robert Jacques Turgot, Baron de Laune; his great grandfather was Michel-Étienne Turgot.
He married Louise Mouton de Lobau, in 1830, daughter of Georges Mouton, comte Lobau.
He had children Jacques-Louis Turgot, who married Tecla de Montaignac in 1867; and Madame Dubois de L'Estaing.

Career
He left Saint-Cyr, and was a trooper in the guard who followed Louis XVIII to Ghent.
He was a Cuirassiers officer in the Royal Guard under the Restoration, he resigned on 26 July 1830.

He rallied to Louis Philippe, and entered the House of Peers in 1832, where he sat with the right, supporters of conservative politics. After the presidential election of 1848, he became a fervent supporter of Louis-Napoleon Bonaparte. He had no official business when, on 26 October 1851, he was appointed foreign minister in the cabinet containing St. Arnaud and Maupas, charged with preparing a coup. Without doubt the Marquis de Turgot owed this amazing promotion to his name, as much as his social position. Although not required, apparently he confided in the coup, and he fully supported, as a man of order, the new regime, that was responsible for admission by the European embassies. On 28 July 1852, he was replaced by Drouyn Lhuys, and was appointed senator.

In April 1853, he obtained the post of ambassador in Madrid. During his mission, he fought a duel with his U.S. counterpart, in which he was seriously injured. Recovered, he became ambassador in August 1858 in Bern, where he remained for eight years until his death. Turgot had said: “Colonies are like fruits which cling to the tree only till they ripen.” He had predicted that as soon as America can take care of herself, she would break away from Britain.

References

1796 births
1866 deaths
French Foreign Ministers
People from Falaise, Calvados